A winsorized mean  is a winsorized statistical measure of central tendency, much like the mean and median, and even more similar to the truncated mean.  It involves the calculation of the mean after winsorizing -- replacing given parts of a probability distribution or sample at the high and low end with the most extreme remaining values, typically doing so for an equal amount of both extremes; often 10 to 25 percent of the ends are replaced. The winsorized mean can equivalently be expressed as a weighted average of the truncated mean and the quantiles at which it is limited, which corresponds to replacing parts with the corresponding quantiles.

Advantages

The winsorized mean is a useful estimator because by retaining the outliers without taking them too literally, it is less sensitive to observations at the extremes than the straightforward mean, and will still generate a reasonable estimate of central tendency or mean for almost all statistical models. In this regard it is referred to as a robust estimator.

Drawbacks

The winsorized mean uses more information from the distribution or sample than the median. However, unless the underlying distribution is symmetric, the winsorized mean of a sample is unlikely to produce an unbiased estimator for either the mean or the median.

Example

 For a sample of 10 numbers (from x(1), the smallest, to x(10) the largest; order statistic notation) the 10% winsorized mean is

 

 The key is in the repetition of x(2) and x(9): the extras substitute for the original values x(1) and x(10) which have been discarded and replaced.

This is equivalent to a weighted average of 0.1 times the 5th percentile (x(2)), 0.8 times the 10% trimmed mean, and 0.1 times the 95th percentile (x(9)).

Notes

References

Means
Robust statistics

de:Mittelwert#Winsorisiertes und getrimmtes Mittel